Otepää Landscape Conservation Area (or Otepää Nature Park) is a nature park situated in Valga County, Estonia.

It's areaea is 22 209 ha.

References

Nature reserves in Estonia
Geography of Valga County
Tourist attractions in Valga County